Henri Arius (1897–1968) was a French film and stage actor.  A character actor he appeared in a large number of films in wartime and post-war France.

Selected filmography
 Jeannou (1943)
 Rooster Heart (1946)
 Inspector Sergil (1947)
 Quai des Orfèvres (1947)
Rumours (1947)
 Sergil and the Dictator (1948)
 The Passenger (1949)
 Two Loves (1949)
 Oriental Port (1950)
 Here Is the Beauty (1950)
 The Convict (1951)
 Sergil Amongst the Girls (1952)
 Je l'ai été trois fois (1952)
 My Husband Is Marvelous (1952)
 Monsieur Scrupule, Gangster (1953)
 Naked in the Wind (1953)
 The Blonde Gypsy (1953)
 Napoleon Road (1953)
 Dangerous Turning (1954)
 Quay of Blondes (1954)
 L'Étrange Désir de monsieur Bard (1954)
 Your Turn, Callaghan (1955)
 Mademoiselle from Paris (1955)
 The Case of Doctor Laurent (1957)
 Girl and the River (1958)
 Toi, le venin (1958)
 Rooster Heart (1958)
 The Law Is the Law (1958)
 A Man Named Rocca (1961)

References

Bibliography
 Crisp, Colin. French Cinema—A Critical Filmography: Volume 2, 1940–1958. Indiana University Press, 2015.
 Maltin, Leonard. Turner Classic Movies Presents Leonard Maltin's Classic Movie Guide: From the Silent Era Through 1965: Third Edition. Penguin,  2015.
 Pirolini, Alessandro. The Cinema of Preston Sturges: A Critical Study. McFarland, 2014.

External links

1897 births
1968 deaths
People from  Marseille
French male film actors